The Tampa United Korean School (TUKS) was formed on , when local Korean schools in the Tampa area were merged to make in improved centre for Korean language and cultural education.  TUKS  is a registered non-profit organization in Florida.

TUKS offers classes on Korean language, culture and history, by teaching the various levels of Korean language (Hangul) courses and having events on Korean traditional holidays:  Chuseok-Korean (Thanksgiving Day), Solnal-Korean (New Year's Day), and Korean Alphabet (Hangul) Day. Other special events are offered throughout the semester such as 'Word contest', 'Storytelling contest', 'Singing contest', 'Drawing contest'.  Extracurricular activities include Learning Hangul though Korean children's songs, and Korean traditional dances.

TUKS is a member of "The National Association for Korean Schools" and "The Florida Association for Korean Schools".

References

External links 
 Official web site

Asian-American culture in Florida
Korean-American culture
Korean international schools
Schools in Florida
1995 establishments in Florida